The Nandi Award for First Best Popular Feature Film winners was institute since 2005:

References

Popular Feature Film